The List of shipwrecks in 1768 includes some ships sunk, wrecked or otherwise lost during 1768.

January

1 January

12 January

13 January

17 January

20 January

22 January

26 January

27 January

Unknown date

February

2 February

3 February

8 February

10 February

11 February

17 February

Unknown date

March

1 March

3 March

12 March

21 March

Unknown date

April

7 April

11 April

19 April

20 April

Unknown date

May

7 May

15 May

18 May

21 May

26 May

27 May

31 May

Unknown date

June

Unknown date

July

21 July

30 July

Unknown date

August

6 August

8 August

9 August

13 August

16 August

21 August

Unknown date

September

1 September

3 September

4 September

5 September

15 September

17 September

Unknown date

October

13 October

15 October

26 October

27 October

30 October

Unknown date

November

5 November

12 November

15 November

23 November

Unknown date

December

1 December

2 December

10 December

11 December

Unknown date

Unknown date

References

1768